The  were corps of soldiers in the armies of France initially put in charge of military policing and justice in the Middle Ages, and later extended to civilian responsibilities. They gradually coalesced into a police force with jurisdiction over the entire population on almost the entire territory of France. They retained powers of extraordinary justice (known as prévôtale) until the French Revolution.

Reforms carried out in the 18th century created the first national police force. In 1791, the force was renamed the Gendarmerie nationale. It is now one of the two national police forces of France, along with the Police nationale.

Terminology 

The term marshalcy is from the French , which is derived from Old French , meaning "the marshalcy." This derives from  attested in 1287 meaning "royal household", and in 1465 as "the office of the marshal".

One account in the history of a small town in western France reports how the terminology was undergoing a change there at the beginning of the  century. At that time, one could refer indistiguishably either to the " of the provost" or " of the " for example, but by 1720 invariably the latter expression was used.

History

Origins 

With the Fall of the Roman Empire, officials in charge of police disappeared. With the rise of feudalism in France, policing powers formerly held by Roman officials were dispersed among a multitude of seigneurs.

The origins of the Maréchaussée are difficult to determine exactly, but occurred sometime during the Hundred Years War (1337–1453). Claims that the origins go back to 1190 under Philip II in the creation of companies of "" during the Crusades are tenuous at best.  Its development began in earnest in the 16th century, reaching its final form under key ordinances in the 1700s.

End of the Middle Ages 

During the Middle Ages and to a lesser extent until the end of the Ancien Régime, the functions of the police and the justice system were closely intertwined. Kings, lords and high dignitaries rendered justice.

Constabulary 

The Constable of France succeeded the Grand Seneschal in 1191 in the exercise of military powers and military justice on behalf of the king. The Constable gathered under him lieutenants bearing the title  Marshal of France who led royal troops into battle and judged their actions. The provosts would quickly take the name "provost of the marshals" to distinguish them from the royal provosts. Rulings were dispensed in separate courts. Judgements on the acts of soldiers such as desertion, treason and disputes with the general population were rendered along with punishments in the Court of the Marshals which existed by 1317. These special forces would eventually be known as the maréchaussée since they worked for the various army marshals.

A second court that existed by 1321 was in the personal jurisdiction of the Constable and oversaw cases involving a point of honor or quarrels between soldiers regarding reputation, personal cases of the king's  and the conduct and service of the provosts of the marshals and their archers. The jurisdictions of the Constable and the marshals were itemized in the Ordinance of 1356.

Provostal tribunals 

After the betrayal of the Constable Louis of Luxembourg, Count of Saint-Pol in 1475, then king Louis XI removed the oft-vacant post of Constable from the head of the constabulary and moved the resolution of points of honor to the Court of Marshals. Some time after, the courts merged under the name, which it retained even after the post of Constable was abolished in 1627. In this new court, the marshals rendered sentences alone.

The provosts' ambit expanded to include policing vagabonds and rendering justice in the provinces.  Their decisions could be appealed up to the marshals and even the Constable. In the 14th century, only one marshal and marshal's provost existed until sometime around 1357, when war and unrest began to increase their numbers through the 15th century.  Six provosts of marshals and up to 300 archers for the marshals and Constable would be recorded by the start of the reign of Francis I in the early 16th century.

16th century 
A consequence of the Hundred Years' War was the formation of "free companies" from unemployed soldiers and mercenaries formerly hired by the king for the war which pillaged the countryside.  France was finally liberated of these companies when future Constable of France Bertrand du Guesclin led them into Spain in 1366.  With continued war between France and her neighbors, organized gang violence involving disbanded soldiers (écorcheurs) lingered and grew into the 16th century. In 1445, Charles VII recruited suitable members of these groups to help form the first paid standing army in Europe (the ) to prosecute war.  However after 1464 and into the early 1500s, the army as well as the marshals' provosts would be called on to also put down the remaining écorcheurs as the ordinary means of policing by bailiffs (bailli) and seneschals was ineffective.  With a limited number of marshals' provosts, lieutenants had to be sent to temporarily represent the provost in the provinces to not only enforce military discipline but apprehend the itinerant looters and robbers and hand them over for judgement by the bailiffs and seneschals.

Whereas the maréchaussée had been historically mobile, the ongoing problems spurred Louis XII to create the first provincial constabularies on January 20, 1514 at the urging of the provinces. The temporary deputy positions changed to official titles, which depending on the size of the province they were attached to were called “Provosts General” and “Provincial Provosts” or “Prévôts Particuliers.”  Their judicial powers remained limited to soldiery. 

His successor, Francis I, went further, establishing such constabularies throughout France.

These special military forces roamed the countryside for up to two days at a time, catching and sentencing evildoers from among the military, and later, among the civilian population as well. They also had the power to sentence perpetrators they had caught, with no possibility of appeal.

The power of the provosts and their archers was limited to the military and the écorcheur bands, leaving out oppressive gangs of civilians who wandered the roads or encamped in the land.  Francis I addressed the problem in a royal decision on 25 January 1536 (Edict of Paris) that extended the judicial competence of the maréchaussée to policing the countryside and main roads of the kingdom, taking on all highway crime regardless of whether the perpetrators were French soldiers or foreigners, military or civilian, vagabonds or residents.  The variety of crimes falling under their jurisdiction increased over the succeeding fifty years.  The expanded commissions were temporary at first until the October 3, 1544 edict put them into permanent competition with the local courts of the bailiffs and seneschals. However, the maréchaussées' ambit remained limited to the country outside the cities. The transformation of the role of the marshals' provosts to a provincial authority necessitated the appointment of new officers (prévôts des armées) to take over their former role of traveling with troops to repress military offenses.

17th century 

After the suppression of the Constabulary in 1626 by Louis XIII, the Constabulary and Marshalcy Tribunal was placed under the command of the Marshal of France.

According to the Criminal Ordinance of 1670 under Louis XIV, certain crimes identified as "royal cases" were investigated by the  but judged by a chamber of the Parliament dealing with criminal matters, while the others, identified as "provost cases", were judged in first and last instance by the  The act broadened the jurisdiction of the Maréchaussée to include burglary and popular disorder and confirmed their power to arrest any offender.  It also sought to combat abuse of their authority by putting enforcement under the supervision of local royal courts.  The powers of the Maréchaussée evolved to include policing of cabarets and road and waterway transport.

Louis XIV's administration profited from selling lieutenant-general posts to head up policing for Paris (created in 1667) and following a 1699 ordinance, for principal towns to oligarchies or feudal lords who sought the titles from vanity or an interest in the job.

18th century 

The  suffered from numerous problems—an uneven presence, lack of oversight, low number of personnel—aggravated by corruption of the officers and poor salaries.  When Louis XIV died in 1714, it was estimated they had only 1,000 men to police all of rural France with companies of  based in larger towns with at times overlapping jurisdictions under the charge of commanders holding a variety of venal titles.

These and other problems led to a series of reforms (1720, 1731, 1768, 1769, 1778) beginning on March 9, 1720 propelled by the Secretary of State for War Claude Le Blanc to make it more effective, reinforce its military character, and improve coverage in the countryside.  A decree issued the day after his first edict by the Regency that followed the death of Louis XIV further focused the Maréchaussée on the suppression of mendicity and vagabondage.  Although the level of these problems had reduced at least in part due to the economic recovery after the end of the wars and the 1709-10 famine as well as existing Maréchaussée efforts, the Ordinance expressed concern about the great number remaining who "beg with insolence, more often through idleness than genuine necessity.

Le Blanc appointed two paymasters in the Maréchaussée in February 1719 to buy back command positions that had been sold or inherited and abolished the old companies and titles in favor of a more structured and hierarchical system.  The Maréchaussée was symbolically placed under the administrative authority of the marshals and the elite , a heavy cavalry corps integrated into the household of the king and later dissolved on 1 April 1788.  However, it was in practice answerable to Le Blanc's office.

The edict of March 1720 profoundly reorganized the Maréchaussée and accentuated its territorial nature. It created a provost court and a company of marshalcy in each of the thirty-six governments or provinces. Maréchaussée companies were separate with one in Lorraine being independent until 1767 after the region's incorporation into France. Le Blanc placed a Provost at the head of each one, residing in the chief town of the province, who could be placed at the disposal of the Intendant. The provostships were divided into lieutenancies, with a lieutenant in each city heading up a presidial court, which in turn were subdivided into squads of four to five men distributed along the main roads. Each squad had to watch over about ten kilometers of road on either side of its headquarters.
The "arrondissement" or "district" of a squad also included several dozen rural parishes in the area. In 1730, there were 30 companies in as many departments, with 3,288 men in 567 squads. The annual budget was 1,846,300 .

From 1760, the junior officers under the provosts became known as "cavaliers". The Royal Order of 25 February 1768 created 200 additional squads and reorganized their location, in order to achieve a more fine-grained and  logical coverage of the territory. Nevertheless, in 1779 the Maréchaussée had no more than 3,300 men divided into 34 companies, one for each region (including Corsica), plus one for Paris and the Île-de-France, and another to ensure the king's security when he traveled, and 800 squads for the entire Kingdom.

After the reform of 1778, all thirty-three companies formed a single corps of six divisions with a total of 4,114 men on the eve of the Revolution, thus forming the first national police force in France.

Revolutionary period 

During the revolutionary period, the  commanders generally placed themselves under the local constitutional authorities. Despite their connection with the king, they were therefore perceived as a force favoring the reforms of the French National Assembly.

Its personnel remained unchanged, and the functions of the force remained much as before. During the revolutionary period, the main force responsible for policing was the National Guard.

In 1791 the newly named  was grouped into 28 divisions, each commanded by a colonel responsible for three départements. In turn, two companies of gendarmes under the command of captains were based in each department. This territorial basis of organization continued throughout the 19th and 20th centuries.

See also 

 Criminal justice system of France
 Criminal law in France
 Judiciary of France
 Law enforcement in France
 National Gendarmerie

References 

Notes

Citations

Works cited

Further reading 

 

 

 
Law enforcement units